Emmy Albiin (9 June 1873 – 24 May 1959) was a Swedish stage and film actress.  A character actress she appeared in around sixty Swedish films.

Selected filmography
 A Lover in Pawn (1920)
 The Mill (1921)
 The Phantom Carriage (1921)
 The Flying Dutchman (1925)
 Ingmar's Inheritance (1925)
 The Devil and the Smalander (1927)
 The Storholmen Brothers (1932)
 The Österman Brothers' Virago (1932)
 People of Hälsingland (1933)
 What Do Men Know? (1933)
 The Atlantic Adventure (1934)
 The Marriage Game (1935)
 The People of Småland (1935)
 Ocean Breakers (1935)
 Johan Ulfstjerna (1936)
 Adolf Saves the Day (1938)
 The Fight Continues (1941)
 Lasse-Maja (1941)
 The Case of Ingegerd Bremssen (1942)
 I Am Fire and Air (1944)
 The People of Simlang Valley (1947)
 Sunshine (1948)
 Big Lasse of Delsbo (1949)
 The Street (1949)
 When Love Came to the Village (1950)
 The Motor Cavaliers (1950)
 Love (1952)
 The Shadow (1953)
 Uncle's (1955)

References

Bibliography
 Steene, Birgitta. Ingmar Bergman: A Reference Guide. Amsterdam University Press, 2005.
 Wright, Rochelle. The Visible Wall: Jews and Other Ethnic Outsiders in Swedish Film. SIU Press, 1998.

External links

1873 births
1959 deaths
Actresses from Stockholm
Swedish stage actresses
Swedish silent film actresses
Swedish film actresses
Burials at Skogskyrkogården